The Hôtel Tassel is a town house in Brussels, Belgium, designed by Victor Horta for the scientist and professor Emile Tassel, and built from 1892 to 1893. It is generally considered the first true Art Nouveau building, because of its highly innovative plan and its ground-breaking use of materials and decoration. It is located at 6, /.

Together with three other town houses of Victor Horta, including Horta's own house and workshop, it was added to the UNESCO World Heritage list in 2000.

History
The first town house built by Victor Horta was the Autrique House. This dwelling was already innovative for its application of a novel Art Nouveau decorative scheme that did not include references to other historical styles. However, the floor plan and spatial composition of the Autrique House remained rather traditional. On the deep and narrow building plot, the rooms were organised according to a traditional scheme used in most Belgian town houses at the time. It had a suite of rooms on the left side of the building plot, flanked by a rather narrow entrance hall with stairs and a corridor that led to a small garden at the back. Of the three-room suite, only the first and the last had windows, so the middle room, used mostly as a dining room, was rather gloomy.

At the Hôtel Tassel, Horta definitively broke with this traditional scheme; in fact, he built a house consisting of three different parts. Two rather conventional buildings in brick and natural stone—one on the side of the street and one on the side of the garden—were linked by a steel structure covered with glass. It functions as the connective part in the spatial composition of the house and contains staircases and landings that connect the different rooms and floors. Through the glass roof, it functions as a light shaft that brings natural light into the centre of the building. In this part of the house, that could also be used for receiving guests, Horta made the maximum of his skills as an interior designer. He designed every single detail; door handles, woodwork, panels and windows in stained glass, mosaic flooring and furnishings. He succeeded in integrating the lavish decoration without masking the general architectural structures.

The innovations made in the Hôtel Tassel would mark the style and approach for most of Horta's later town houses, including the Hôtel van Eetvelde, the Hôtel Solvay and the architect's own house and workshop. These houses were expensive to construct and only affordable by the haute-bourgeoisie. For this reason the pure architectural innovations were not largely followed by other architects. Most other Art Nouveau dwellings in Belgium and other European countries were inspired by Horta's whiplash decorative style which is mostly applied to a more traditional building.

The Hôtel Tassel had a decisive influence on the French Art Nouveau architect Hector Guimard, who later developed a personal interpretation of Horta's example.

As of 2017, the Hôtel Tassel was a private office.

Exterior design and facade
The building's exterior, namely the facade, is in itself an example of Art Nouveau. Horta implemented a number of different stylistic changes that distinguished the building from others at the time. These changes, however, all existed within the realm of Art Nouveau, and came from his selection of materials and the way that they all came together to form a building that exemplified the style as a whole. For example, the exterior is designed to be smooth and have a sense of fluidity.

Horta also diverged from typical architectural conventions by making the columns that dominate the front portion out of iron, as opposed to stone. These slender iron columns house a large bay window that furthers Horta's stylistic goals by creating a sense of openness and lightness to the building. Exposed rivets and framing methods, such as large brackets around the doors and windows create a sense of unity within the architecture  The organic acanthus set against the riveted iron beams that house the windows display Horta's desire to fuse nature and industry.

Interior design
The interior is similarly notable as it features Horta's innovative open floor plan and use of natural light. Rooms in the town house were built around a central hall, which was, at the time, fairly groundbreaking. Materials used on the inside are purposefully visible and conform to the Art Nouveau style by being modeled after organic forms. The whole interior retains a cohesive sense of fluidity thanks to Horta's insistence on designing all of the interior elements.

Awards
The UNESCO commission recognised the Hôtel Tassel as UNESCO World Heritage in 2000, as part of the listing 'Major Town Houses of the Architect Victor Horta':

See also
 Art Nouveau in Brussels
 History of Brussels
 Belgium in "the long nineteenth century"

References

Notes

Bibliography

External links

 Article about the Hôtel Tassel at decortips.com

Houses in Belgium
City of Brussels
World Heritage Sites in Belgium
Victor Horta buildings
Art Nouveau architecture in Brussels
Art Nouveau houses
Houses completed in 1893